Michael Dion is a record producer in jazz music and the owner of the California-based record label, ITI Records. He also was the owner of Startup Marketing and has had directorial and managerial positions with record labels such as ABC Records,  Mobile Fidelity and Valley Vue Records. He is also an author of several books.

Background
In the music business, Dion has worked for Texas-based wholesaler, Music Distributors Inc.. He was the founder of Startup Marketing, a San Diego music label representation and  distribution firm. It was later acquired by Paulstarr. Some of the record labels he worked for were Springboard and Phonodisc. He also worked for ABC Records in various roles and was also director of field operations for the firm. In 1979, he began working for Mobile Fidelity as its Western regional sales manager. Working for the well-known audiophile record label, which was based in Chatsworth, California, he was promoted to the position of national sales director in early 1980. In December that year, it was announced that he was made director of its international sales and marketing. Towards the end of 1981 he had been promoted to the position of vice-president of international sales. In April 1985, he became vice-president of Mobile Fidelity Sound Lab, replacing Mark Wexler who relocated to the East Coast. 

He also held the upper executive position of vice-president and general manager of a small Californian record label Valley Vue Records, which was founded by Hillery Johnson.<ref>Soul Train - [http://soultrain.com/2013/06/24/10-of-the-best-ballads-of-the-80s/ 10 of The Best Ballads of the 80s, The Manhattans, Why You Wanna Love Me Like This (1989)]</ref>

ITI Records
In the early 1980s, he founded ITI Records, a Jazz record label. He also expressed interest in releasing other genres. One of them was classical.

In 1998, Dion had a break from the industry having been recalled to military service as a result of the Bosnian and Middle East wars. After he retired from military service, returned to the music industry and his record label ITI records became active again.Smooth Jazz Vibes, September 2012 - September 30, 2012 ITI Records Resurfaces After Many Years Dormant

Production
It was announced in the October 8, 1983 issue of Cashbox Michael Dion and Michael Grantham had formed a production company to produce jazz and classical artists. The name of the company was In The Interest Productions.
Some of the albums he has produced are Blackberry Winter by  Mike Campbell & Tom Garvin, Blue Sud by Marc Devine and Art Johnson. He was the executive producer for Cozzetti & Gemmill's album Soft Flower in Spring which was released in 1983.

By the time his record label ITI records had 15 albums in its catalogue, he arranged a deal for a different genre, Dance! The act was Zone Patrol and the labels first venture into that genre.

Acts produced (selective)

Publications

Personal
He is married to Laura Evaneski, author of Gone Too Soon''.

Recent activity
In January 2015, he attended the Jazz Connect Conference that was  held at Saint Peter's Church, New York City, located at 54th and Lexington. But because of the amount of attendees, the usual venue being the Hilton New York was changed to the Church.

References

American entertainment industry businesspeople
Jazz record producers
Record producers from Los Angeles
Living people
Year of birth missing (living people)